Drive Creek is a creek in the Nelson River drainage basin in Kenora District, northwestern Ontario, Canada. The creek then takes in its right tributary Tripoli Creek at an elevation of  just upstream of its mouth at the Marchington River at the same elevation.

Tributaries
Tripoli Creek

See also
List of rivers of Ontario

References

Rivers of Kenora District